The name mastiff bat is applied to certain species of the bat family Molossidae or so called free-tailed bats. It is usually applied specifically to the following genera:

 Eumops, mastiff bats or bonneted bats
 Mops (bat), greater mastiff bats, a genus of bats in the family Molossidae
 Promops, dome-palate mastiff bats
 Chaerephon (bat), lesser mastiff bats

and sometimes more loosely to the rest of the family.

Animal common name disambiguation pages